Is Your Honeymoon Really Necessary? is a 1953 British comedy film directed by Maurice Elvey. The film was based on Vivian Tidmarsh's 1944 West End hit play by the same name.

Plot
When US Navy airman Commander Laurie Vining takes up his new posting in London with his new wife Gillian he has no idea that his first wife Candy Markham will turn up and threaten his marital bliss by claiming they are still married. Faithful confidant Hank Hanlon continually stirs things up and tries to keep order. Other lives that are changed forever by the intervention include lawyer Frank Betterton.

Cast
Bonar Colleano as Cmdr. Laurie Vining
Diana Dors as Candy Markham
David Tomlinson as Frank Betterton
Diana Decker as Gillian Vining
Sid James as Hank Hanlon
Audrey Freeman as Lucy
Hubert Woodward as Hicks
MacDonald Parke as Adm. Fields
Lou Jacobi as Capt. Noakes

Production
The play debuted in 1944 in London, originally starring Ralph Lynn, and ran for almost three years. Film rights were bought in February 1953 as a vehicle for Diana Dors. The screenplay was by Talbot Rothwell who went on to write 20 Carry On films.

Filming took place over four weeks in April at Nettlefold Studios, Walton-on-Thames. Dors was paid a fee of £1,000.

Reception
According to BFI's Screenonline, the "film belongs to Dors. Ideally cast as mischievous, ultra-blonde temptress Candy, she sashays towards centre stage with a seemingly effortless lightness of step, adding much-needed sparkle to well-worn material. While never appearing to take herself - or the script - the slightest bit seriously, she steals the show with careless assurance."

The Monthly Film Bulletin called it an "uneven bedroom farce. On the debit side: time-worn situations, bad timing; on the credit side: some good playing from David Tomlinson, as yet another shy, respectable Englishman, and from Diana Dors, responding to the essence of the piece beautifully by exuding 100 per cent sex."

Filmink said Dors was "full of life and vigour".

The play was still being presented in London's West End starring Brian Rix in the mid 1960s.

See also
The Disturbed Wedding Night (1950)

References

External links

Is Your Honeymoon Really Necessary? at BFI Screenonline

1953 films
1950s English-language films
1953 comedy films
British black-and-white films
Films directed by Maurice Elvey
British films based on plays
British comedy films
Films with screenplays by Talbot Rothwell
Films set in England
Comedy of remarriage films
1950s British films